Selamuthu Pinna is a 2004 Sri Lankan Sinhala romantic drama film directed by Roy de Silva and produced by G. R. Padmaraj. It stars two popular singers Athula Adhikari and Indika Upamali in lead roles along with Sanath Gunathilake and Cletus Mendis. Music composed by Somapala Rathnayake. It is the 1034th Sri Lankan film in the Sinhala cinema.

Plot

Cast
 Indika Upamali as Mali
 Athula Adhikari as Janu
 Sanath Gunathilake as Sanath sir
 Cletus Mendis
 Rajitha Hiran
 Sumana Amarasinghe
 Damayantha Perera
 Sunil Hettiarachchi

References

2004 films
2000s Sinhala-language films